Abdullah Farouk (born on 19 August 1986) is an Egyptian football midfielder who plays for Egyptian Premier League club Al-Ahly

2009/2010 season 
In the 2009/2010 season Abdullah Farouk was included in the Ahly squad surprisingly as it was said that he will be heading some place else. Abdullah Farouk performed superbly and is now a regular in the squad. Abdullah's position has changed throughout the weeks.

References

1986 births
Living people
Egyptian footballers
Al Ahly SC players
Association football midfielders
Ittihad El Shorta SC players
Egyptian Premier League players